Selchow and Righter was a 19th- and 20th-century game manufacturer best known for the games Parcheesi and Scrabble.  It was based in Bay Shore, New York.

It dates back to 1867 
when it was founded as E. G. Selchow & Co. In 1880, to reflect his new partnership with John Righter, the company name was changed to Selchow and Righter. 
Games were also produced by Chaffee & Selchow, particularly between 1897 and 1902. Until the mid-twentieth century Selchow and Righter was considered a "jobber", a game company that produced and licensed other peoples' games. Under the leadership of John Righter's daughter, Harriet T. Righter, who was the company's president from 1923 to 1954, Selchow and Righter began manufacturing games, and put more emphasis on advertising and marketing campaigns.

Their first hit was Parcheesi, which they purchased the rights to in 1870 and trademarked in 1874. In 1952 they licensed Scrabble from James Brunot, then purchased that trademark in 1972.  Other notable S&R games include Anagrams (1934), which is a Victorian word game, originally published by Selchow and Righter, Jotto (1955), which was licensed by Selchow and Righter in the 1970s, and Trivial Pursuit which was licensed from Horn Abbot in 1982.

Other games which were produced by Selchow and Righter:
Allstate Travel Games (from the box cover: "Designed specifically for use in auto. For ages six to 14")
Assembly Line
Blast Off
Cap-It
Cargoes
Cabby
Dr.Tangle
Games Galore!
Globe-Trotters
Go for Broke
Home Team Baseball
Huggin' the Rail
Jamboree
Straightaway (1961) – based on the 1961–1962 television series Straightaway
Karate (1964)
Meet the Presidents
 Plantem (sometime between 1928 and 1955, described as a “colorful intensely interesting game for young and old!”) 2, 3, or 4 players roll dice with letters Y, R, G, W, and P to signify colors yellow, red, green, white and purple, the colors of the flowers you “plant” on your board. The last side of the die has a black dot which when rolled allows you to steal a flower from another’s garden. Your goal is to complete your garden (five rows with five flowers each) first.
Whodunit (1972) A similar game to Clue in which 6 players move around the board as investigators, obtaining opportunities to view other player's "alibi" tokens and collecting other "clues" to the identify of the murderer, weapon used, room in which committed, and a new category: motive. Whodunit draws on a similar setting and character types, including a colonel and maid, but in which the suspects are not the players.
Mr. Ree! (1937)
Prospecting
Speed
Super Market
Snake Eyes
The Game of Alice in Wonderland (1882)
Ur: Royal Game of Sumer
Scrabble People (card game for ages 4–8, copyright 1985)

Selchow and Righter was purchased by Coleco Industries in 1986 for $75 million USD in cash and notes.  
Coleco Industries purchased the games from Selchow & Righter, but not the trademark of the company's name. The trademark for "Righter" in the commercial use of games and entertainment remains under the control of the Righter Family; specifically, Philip Righter, the great-great-grandson of John Righter, the company's original co-founder.

Trojan Powder Coating, Tri-State Powder Coating, and Williams Architecture now occupy the site of the former Selchow and Righter building.

References

External links
MobyGames Profile
Giant Bomb Profile

Board game publishing companies
Game manufacturers
Defunct companies based in New York (state)
Manufacturing companies established in 1867
Manufacturing companies disestablished in 1986
Former Hasbro subsidiaries